Percy Hobson may refer to:

 Percy Hobson (RAF officer) (1893–?), British World War I flying ace
 Percy Hobson (high jumper) (born 1942), Australian high jumper